This is a list of current further education and higher education colleges in Northern Ireland most of which provide both levels of qualification.

Further education colleges offer courses for people over the age of 14, involving school-level qualifications such as Higher Grade exams, as well as work-based learning and apprenticeships. Higher education colleges also offer undergraduate qualifications and post-graduate qualifications.

Northern Irish colleges are funded the Department for the Economy (DfE).

 Belfast Metropolitan College
 College of Agriculture, Food & Rural Enterprise
 Northern Regional College
 North West Regional College
 South Eastern Regional College
 Southern Regional College
 South West College

See also
 Education in Northern Ireland
 List of further education colleges in England
 List of further education colleges in Wales
 List of further education colleges in Scotland

External links
Department for Employment and Learning NI

 
Northern Ireland